"What Kind of Love Are You On" is a song by American hard rock band Aerosmith.  The song, originally a track left off the Nine Lives album, was included on Armageddon: The Album for the 1998 film Armageddon starring lead singer Steven Tyler's daughter Liv Tyler. The song, was released as a promotional single to rock radio, reaching #4 on the Mainstream Rock Tracks chart. It was written by Steven Tyler, guitarist Joe Perry and outside songwriters Jack Blades and Tommy Shaw (both formerly of Damn Yankees). It is the second song written for the film, the other being "I Don't Want to Miss a Thing".

Charts

References

1998 singles
1998 songs
Aerosmith songs
Songs written by Tommy Shaw
Songs written by Jack Blades
Songs written by Steven Tyler
Songs written by Joe Perry (musician)
Song recordings produced by Matt Serletic
Columbia Records singles